The Dimonds is a rural locality in the Fraser Coast Region, Queensland, Australia.

Geography
Kalah Creek forms the southern boundary, while several tidal inlets also drain to the Great Sandy Strait.

The locality is predominantly coastal tree swamps with Melaleuca and Eucalypt species predominating. The land is mostly undeveloped and unused. There is a small amount of residential and agricultural land use in the south-east of the locality.

History 

Education 
There are no schools in The Dimonds. The nearest government primary school is Granville State School in Granville to the west. The nearest government secondary school is Maryborough State High School in Maryborough to the west.

References 

Fraser Coast Region
Localities in Queensland